Tarkhinabad (also Romanized as Tarkhīnābād; also known as Tarfīnābād and Tarkhisābad) is a village in Seyyed Jamal ol Din Rural District, in the Central District of Asadabad County, Hamadan Province, Iran. At the 2006 census, its population was 695, in 184 families.

References 

Populated places in Asadabad County